is a retired Japanese professional baseball pitcher. He made his Nippon Professional Baseball debut in 1993 for the Fukuoka Daiei Hawks. Tabata later played for the Yakult Swallows, Osaka Kintetsu Buffaloes and Yomiuri Giants.

External links

1969 births
Living people
Baseball people from Toyama Prefecture
Japanese baseball players
Nippon Professional Baseball pitchers
Fukuoka Daiei Hawks players
Yakult Swallows players
Osaka Kintetsu Buffaloes players
Yomiuri Giants players
Japanese baseball coaches
Nippon Professional Baseball coaches